Tishman Realty & Construction Co., Inc. is an American corporation founded in 1898 that owns and develops real estate. The company is known for being the contractor that built the original World Trade Center in New York City. Tishman Construction Corporation, the construction division of the company, was sold to AECOM in 2010.

History
Julius Tishman started Tishman Realty & Construction in 1898. A Polish immigrant with a desire to be self-employed, he entered the real estate business by saving enough money to purchase the tenement building where he lived, acquiring additional residential properties and gaining the ability to renovate, lease and finance them on his own. The company went public in 1928 as Tishman Realty & Construction, becoming an integrated real estate and construction firm.

Tishman Realty & Construction worked on significant projects around New York in the 1960s and 1970s, including Madison Square Garden and the World Trade Center. This public company liquidated in 1976, selling the Tishman Research and Construction company to Rockefeller Center Inc. The primary shareholders began three separate private companies: a continuation of Tishman Realty & Construction, a real estate development company called Tishman Speyer, and a leasing company called Tishman Management and Leasing Corporation.

Tishman Hotel & Realty LP
Tishman Hotel & Realty LP (THR) is a subsidiary that focuses primarily on large, complex properties with a long-term ownership strategy. THR comprises a diversified staff of experienced real estate, financial and hotel management specialists, and complemented by a technical staff of architects, engineers, and construction management professionals. THR's affiliate, Tishman Construction Corporation, is one of the nation's leading construction management firms, providing a wide range of construction services for projects of varying scope, budget, schedule, and complexity. Given these broad resources, THR typically manages all components of its projects, from feasibility, design, budgeting, financing and development management to ongoing property and asset management.

List of Tishman Hotel & Realty LP properties
 The Westin New York at Times Square
 E Walk Retail on 42nd Street (Connected to the Westin)
 Walt Disney World Dolphin (co-owned with MetLife)
 Walt Disney World Swan (co-owned with Metlife)
 Hilton in the Walt Disney World Resort
 Sheraton Chicago and Hotel Towers
 Sheraton Old San Juan Hotel
 Aloft Chicago Mag Mile
 Homewood Suites Lake Buena Vista
 Hilton Garden Inn Lake Buena Vista
 Homewood Suites Theme Parks/Sea World Orlando

Tishman Construction Corporation
The Tishman Construction Corporation was a construction division of the company until 2010, when it was sold to AECOM. It was a privately held firm headquartered in New York City, with operating subsidiaries located across the United States. It was owned by Dan Tishman, who is now a member of the board of directors for AECOM. Tishman Construction is serving as Construction Manager for One World Trade Center and the World Trade Center Transportation Hub.

List of properties built by Tishman Construction Corporation 

 Central Plaza, Los Angeles, CA (1952)
 666 Fifth Avenue, Manhattan, New York, NY (1957)
 Tishman Building, 3325 Wilshire Boulevard, Los Angeles, CA (1957)
East Ohio Building Cleveland, OH (1957-1958)
 10 Lafayette Square, Buffalo, NY (1957-1958)
Wilshire Terrace Apartments, Los Angeles, CA, (1958)
 Tishman 615 Building, 811 Wilshire Boulevard, Los Angeles, CA (1960)
 Southbridge Towers, Manhattan, New York, NY (1961-1971) 
 Gateway Towers, Pittsburgh, PA (1964)
 John Hancock Center, Chicago, IL (1965-1968)
Two Pennsylvania Plaza, Manhattan, New York, NY (1967-1968)
 World Trade Center, Manhattan, New York, NY (1967-1973) (Destroyed during the terrorist attacks of September 11, 2001)
919 Third Avenue, Manhattan, New York, NY (1970-1971)
 Renaissance Center, Detroit, MI (1973-1981)
FourFortyFour South Flower Building, Los Angeles, CA, (1978-1981)
 Marriott World Trade Center, Manhattan, New York, NY (1979-1981) (Destroyed during the terrorist attacks of September 11, 2001)
Camelback Lakes Office Park, Phoenix, AZ (1981)
 Epcot Theme Park, Bay Lake, FL, (1982)
 7 World Trade Center, Manhattan, New York, NY (1984-1987) (Destroyed during the terrorist attacks of September 11, 2001)
Tower 49, Manhattan, New York, NY (1985)
Orange Executive Tower, Orange, CA (1986-1987)
Ronald Reagan State Building, Los Angeles, CA (1988-1990)
3 Times Square, Manhattan, New York, NY (1998-2001)
 425 Fifth Avenue, Manhattan, New York, NY (2001-2003)
 7 World Trade Center, Manhattan, New York, NY (2002-2006)
Bank of America Tower, Manhattan, New York, NY (2004-2009)
 One World Trade Center, Manhattan, New York, NY (2006-2014)
Four Seasons Hotel, Manhattan, New York, NY (2007-2016)
 4 World Trade Center, Manhattan, New York, NY (2008-2014)
 3 World Trade Center, Manhattan, New York, NY (2010-2018)
30 Hudson Yards, Manhattan, New York, NY (2014-2019)
1 Manhattan West, Manhattan, New York, NY (2018-2019)
11 Hoyt, Brooklyn, New York, NY (2017-2020)
One Vanderbilt, Manhattan, New York, NY (2017-2020)

Recent news
In December 2015, Tishman agreed to settle an overbilling probe for a fee of $20.2 million, resolving a US-led investigation into alleged fraudulent overbilling. The scheme involved improper overtime payments to union workers.

See also
 Tishman Speyer
 John L. Tishman

References

External links
 

Construction and civil engineering companies of the United States
Real estate companies of the United States
Companies based in New York City
Hospitality companies of the United States